The Dutch People's Union (NVU) is a Dutch Neo-Nazi political party. The party supports a merger between the Netherlands and Flanders.

History 
The party was founded as a political party on 27 May 1971 by Guus Looy, with as key purpose to rehabilitate convicted WW-II war criminals. In 1973 Roeland Raes, of the Belgian Vlaams Blok, became vice-president (reflecting the desire of both parties to unite the Netherlands and Flanders) and later that year Joop Glimmerveen took over the position of president. During the 1970s, the party became increasingly militant as younger neo-Nazis joined its ranks.

When Glimmerveen revealed his sympathy for Adolf Hitler and Anton Mussert and the NVU became more and more a Nazi party, support for the party collapsed and it was forbidden. Due to a mistake in the law, the NVU managed to continue after it was forbidden. Some members formed the Centrumpartij (CP), which later split into the Centrum Demokraten (CD) and CP'86. In the mid-eighties, the NVU collapsed completely.

In 1996, a few young neo-Nazis asked then-68-year-old Joop Glimmerveen to start the NVU again and he did. In 1998, they tried to enter the city council elections in Den Haag and Arnhem, but did not succeed. At this moment, the NVU is the most active party on the extreme right in the Netherlands and gets support from the Aktiefront Nationale Socialisten (ANS), a small organization of activists who claim solidarity with the plight of the Palestinians and other groups which they consider to be anti-imperialist. The number of members of the NVU is unknown.

Criticism 
One of the biggest critics of current NVU's leader Constant Kusters is Joop Glimmerveen, the face and leader of the NVU since the beginning of the 1970s and party ideologist until the end of the 1990s. In 1996 after almost 11 years of inactivity, Glimmerveen handed the NVU over to Kusters and Eite Homan.

Glimmerveen gave up NVU membership in 1994 but kept control of the editorial rights of the party magazine Wij Nederland. Kusters writes and edits the party newspaper Wij Europa but Glimmerveen cannot stand either its ideological course or its 'shoddy production'.

In 2003, Glimmerveen published a special edition of Wij Nederland full of letters to Kusters, the latter's answers, and his own vision of the NVU. Among other things, Glimmerveen has charged Kusters with misuse of NVU funds for his own benefit and threatened him with court action.

Election results 
The Dutch People's Union participated in city council elections in several cities in 1974, 1986, 2002, 2006 and 2010. In none of these elections they gained enough votes for a seat in the council. They also participated in the States-Provincial elections in Gelderland in 2003 and 2007, but here too did not get enough votes for a seat in the Council. In 1977, 1981 and 1982 the party participated in elections for the House of Representatives (Tweede Kamer), but did not get a seat in the house.

* Party was listed as Lijst Glimmerveen

Notes

References 

  (Half the links on this website do not load)

Formerly banned far-right parties
Political parties established in 1971
1971 establishments in the Netherlands
Neo-Nazi political parties in Europe
Neo-Nazism in the Netherlands
Nationalist parties in the Netherlands